Joe Aillet Stadium (formerly Louisiana Tech Stadium) is a college football stadium in Ruston, Louisiana and the home field of the Louisiana Tech University Bulldogs football team, which competes in Conference USA. The football stadium replaced the original Tech Stadium where the school's football program played its home games on campus until 1967.

Originally called Louisiana Tech Stadium, Joe Aillet Stadium opened in 1968 and was renamed for retired Louisiana Tech head football coach and athletic director Joe Aillet in 1972.

History

The stadium was built in 1968 with an original capacity of 23,318 as a replacement for the original "Tech Stadium" on the university's campus. The new football stadium was constructed on the northwest portion of the campus as part of a new athletic complex which included a 3,000-seat baseball stadium now known as J. C. Love Field at Pat Patterson Park, 10 lighted tennis courts, and a track and field complex now known as the Jim Mize Track and Field Complex.

The new stadium, known as Tech Stadium or Louisiana Tech Stadium at the time, hosted its first Louisiana Tech home football game on September 28, 1968 when quarterback Terry Bradshaw led the Bulldogs to a 35–7 victory over the East Carolina University Pirates.

After four seasons as Tech Stadium, the stadium was renamed Joe Aillet Stadium prior to the 1972 season in honor of Joe Aillet, the longtime head football coach and athletic director of Louisiana Tech who died on December 28, 1971. On November 11, 1972, the official dedication ceremonies of the newly renamed Joe Aillet Stadium were held during a home football game between Tech and Eastern Michigan.

The 1997 season saw the largest crowd in school history of 28,714 for a 17–16 victory by the Bulldogs over the Northeast Louisiana Indians.

Future professional quarterback Tim Rattay was involved in the first-ever matchup of future pro quarterbacks at the stadium, facing off against UCF's Daunte Culpepper in 1998.

The first nationally televised game at the stadium came in 2002 against the Fresno State Bulldogs.

In an October 2004 rematch, the team achieved an upset victory by defeating the 17th-ranked Bulldogs.

In 2008, the team defeated the Mississippi State University Bulldogs 22–14 in its season opener. It was the first-ever visit by a school from a BCS conference to Joe Aillet Stadium.

Notable Games

1960s
September 28, 1968: Louisiana Tech defeated East Carolina 35–7 in the first home football game inside the new Tech Stadium.

1970s
December 1, 1973: Louisiana Tech defeated Western Illinois 18–13 in a Division II Quarterfinals game. Tech would go on to win the Division II National Championship in 1973.
November 30, 1974: Louisiana Tech defeated Western Carolina 10–7 in a Division II Quarterfinals game.

1980s
December 4, 1982: Louisiana Tech defeated South Carolina State 38–3 in a Division I-AA Quarterfinal playoff game.
November 24, 1984: Louisiana Tech defeated Mississippi Valley State 66–19 in a Division I-AA 1st Round Playoff Game. Tech would eventually lose in the Division I-AA Championship game against Delaware later that year.
September 12, 1987: Louisiana Tech lost to Northeast Louisiana University (now known as UL-Monroe) 44–7 in front of 24,975 people, the largest crowd for a Tech home football game in Joe Aillet Stadium at that point. The attendance record for this game would last for ten seasons.
October 14, 1989: In their first home football game at The Joe as a Division I-A football program, Louisiana Tech defeated Northern Illinois 42–21.

1990s
September 13, 1997: A crowd of 28,714 witnesses Louisiana Tech's 17–16 victory over Northeast Louisiana University. The crowd still remains the largest crowd to witness a Louisiana Tech home football game at Joe Aillet Stadium.

2000s
September 16, 2000: In the first-ever overtime game in Joe Aillet Stadium, Louisiana Tech lost to Stephen F. Austin 34–31 in double overtime.
December 5, 2002: Louisiana Tech lost to Fresno State 45–13 in the first nationally televised home football game in the history of The Joe.
October 2, 2004: Louisiana Tech upset (17) Fresno State 28–21 in the first home game at The Joe to feature a Top-25 ranked team.
October 14, 2005: Tulane loses to UTEP 45–21 in a "home" game at The Joe. Tulane's football team was displaced after their home stadium, the Louisiana Superdome, was damaged by Hurricane Katrina in August 2005 and had to play all their football games on the road.
September 8, 2007: Louisiana Tech lost to (20) Hawaii 45–44 in double overtime after failing to score on a two-point conversion in the second overtime. This Hawaii team would go on to a 12–1 overall record, WAC title, and a bid in the 2008 Sugar Bowl against Georgia.
August 30, 2008: Louisiana Tech defeated Mississippi State 22–14. This was the first matchup between Tech and a school from a BCS conference at Joe Aillet Stadium.

2010s
November 26, 2011: On a rainy night at The Joe, Louisiana Tech defeated conference foe New Mexico State 44–0. This win sealed an outright Western Athletic Conference Championship for Louisiana Tech, the second conference title in eleven seasons.
November 3, 2012: (22) Louisiana Tech defeated UTSA 51–27 at The Joe in front of a crowd of 23,645. This marks the first home football game at The Joe in which Louisiana Tech was ranked in the Top 25.
November 17, 2012: In the first home game at The Joe as a Top-20 college football program, (19) Louisiana Tech lost to Utah State 48–41 in overtime in front of 25,614. This crowd marks the third largest attendance in the history of The Joe.

Features

Davison Athletics Complex

Davison Athletics Complex is located behind the south end zone of Joe Aillet Stadium. The three-story,  facility features a weight room, locker room, players lounge, auditorium, coaches offices, position meeting rooms and the club level.  The $22 million facility opened on September 4, 2015. The project was led by Ruston-based contractor Lincoln Builders.

Charles Wyly Athletic Center

The Charles Wyly Athletic Center is located at the southwest side of Joe Aillet Stadium adjacent to the Davison Athletics Complex and the field house. Construction of the Wyly Athletic Center began in 2000, and the facility opened in June 2001. The  facility houses the Dr. William Bundrick Sports Medicine Center, Dr. Guthrie Jarrell Conference Room, Louisiana Tech football museum, coaches offices, and team meeting rooms. The Bundrick Sports Medicine Center includes a Swimex therapeutic pool, cardiovascular equipment, physician's examination room, and staff offices. The museum was designed by Richard Smith of Murphy and Orr Exhibits and features Terry Bradshaw memorabilia, plaques for each Tech All-American, displays honoring Tech's top offensive and defensive players, a 100-year timeline of Bulldog football, a lighted wall collage of La. Tech legends, and other exhibits. The $2.5 million facility was privately funded by a $1 million gift from businessman Charles Wyly and contributions from physicians Dr. William Bundrick and Dr. Guthrie Jarrell.

Dawgzilla

Dawgzilla is the name of the HD LED video display board and sound system located behind the north end zone of Joe Aillet Stadium. The video board was designed, manufactured, and installed by Daktronics during the summer of 2009. The total video display area measures , which made Dawgzilla the largest video board in the Western Athletic Conference after its construction in 2009. Also installed atop the video display is a custom Sportsound sound system. The video board is mounted on a brick foundation constructed by Lincoln Builders and is flanked by artistic metal displays. The Dawgzilla project cost $2 million and was financed through a partnership with Learfield Sports and Community Trust Bank.

Other uses
In 1985 Louisiana Tech hosted the New Orleans Saints training camp.

The Louisiana Tech Lady Techster soccer team originally used Joe Aillet Stadium as its home facility upon the program's inception in 2004. The first Lady Techster soccer game in the stadium was on August 28, 2005, a 2–0 win over the Mississippi Valley State Delta Devils. In 2009, the Lady Techsters soccer team moved to their new home field located across the street from the stadium.

Future
In 2021, a multi-phase project was announced to upgrade and expand the stadium, including the addition of 2 new Daktronics video boards in the corners of the north end zone, a Champions Plaza adjacent to Stadium Drive on the north side of the stadium, and a ribbon board added to the facade of the Davison Athletics Complex on the south end. Most notably, the plans also include the construction of a new 22,300-square foot student-athlete access center to be located at the north end of the stadium. These plans are all expected to be finished within the next 5 to 10 years.

See also
List of NCAA Division I FBS football stadiums

References

External links
 Joe Aillet Stadium at LaTechSports.com

College football venues
American football venues in Louisiana
Louisiana Tech Bulldogs football
Louisiana Tech University
Sports venues in Ruston, Louisiana
Buildings and structures in Lincoln Parish, Louisiana
Sports venues completed in 1968
1968 establishments in Louisiana